The Disguiser is a 2015 Chinese spy war television drama based on Zhang Yong's novel, Spy War on Shanghai Bund (諜戰上海灘). It was produced by Hou Hongliang and directed by Li Xue, and stars Hu Ge, Jin Dong, Liu Mintao and Wang Kai as the members of the Ming family. The series tells the story Ming Tai, a rich and naive young master of the Ming household, who is trained to become a spy for the Kuomintang to fight Wang Jingwei’s leadership of Japan’s puppet regime in China. It originally aired daily on Hunan Television from 31 August to 28 September 2015.

The series was met with critical acclaim, receiving 37.5 million views on Youku as well as topping Sohu TV ratings, and was nominated for "Outstanding Drama" at the 30th Flying Apsaras Awards.

Synopsis
The plot centers around the Ming household during the Japanese occupation era: college student Ming Tai is kidnapped by Nationalist government leader Wang Tianfeng, who gives him spy training and a life-and-death partner Yu Manli to carry out the party's many missions. The oldest brother, Ming Lou is the patriarch of the Ming household, while also holding many important positions and connections in the Nationalist government, Chinese Communist Party, the Reorganized Government, and the Japanese government, although not many know his true intentions and loyalties. Ming Cheng acts as the Ming Lou's trusted assistant, making him the number one target for others to get to Ming Lou. Through the many dangerous predicaments the family face, together, they fight to bring down their enemies and end the occupation.

Cast 
 Ming household
 Hu Ge as Ming Tai, a spoiled, naive and youngest brother of the family. His birth mother died saving Ming Lou and Ming Jing from an assassination attempt, leaving him orphaned. The siblings later took him in as an adopted member of the family. Ming Tai is gifted in his skills as a spy but still retains an immature personality. His code name is "Scorpion".
 Jin Dong as Ming Lou, the oldest brother. On the surface he is an official in the collaborationist government, but his true loyalties are a mystery. Highly skilled in the ways of espionage, his code name is "Viper".
 Liu Mintao as Ming Jing, the sister who acts as the mother of the whole family unit. She is the chairman of the Ming Corporation and secretly funds the Chinese Communist Party. She tries to keep Ming Tai away from politics for his safety by sending him away for an education.
 Wang Kai as Ming Cheng (Ah-Cheng), the middle brother who is the assistant of Ming Lou. He was adopted by the Ming housekeeper Auntie Gui. After seeing how abusive she was toward the boy, the Ming siblings decided to take Ah-Cheng into their family.
 Guo Hong as Auntie Gui, Ming Cheng's adopted mother who was dismissed for her abusive behavior toward him. She later reappeared and became a spy for Wang Man Chun, collecting intelligence from the Ming family.
 Zhu Mengyao as Ah-Xiang, the family maid.
 Feng Hui as Ming Tang, Ming's cousin and a wealthy business owner.
 Nationalist government
 Liu Yijun as Wang Tianfeng, the leader of the Nationalist government's military training program who recognized Ming Tai's abilities and kidnapped him. He trained Ming Tai to become a spy and made him the leader of his team. His code name is "Wasp".
 Song Yi as Yu Manli, Ming Tai's life-and-death partner. She was sold to a brothel by her father but was saved by Boss Yu, who sent her to school. However, he was robbed and killed. She later took revenge by murdering the criminals, and while waiting for her death sentence, was discovered and recruited by Wang Tianfeng.
 Wang Zheng as Guo Qiyun
 Wang Hong as Adviser Lin
 Chinese Communist Party
 Wang Lejun as Cheng Jinyun, a medical student who works as a spy for the Communist party. She is a frequent partner during Ming Tai's missions. The two eventually fall in love and marry. 
 Guo Xiaofeng as Uncle Li, Ming Tai's long lost father.
 Zhang Yanyan as Dr. Su
 Sun Chen as Dong Yan
 Gao Xin as Zhang Yueyin
 Department 76
 Wang Ou as Wang Manchun, Ming Lou's lover and director of the intelligence department of Department 76. She is of the Wang family, who are sworn enemies of the Mings, although she still cares for Ming Lou deeply.
 Yue Yang as Liang Zhongchun, Director of Operations at Department 76. He is often competing with Wang Manchun for the head of Department 76.
 Sun Mengjia as Zhu Huiyin
 Liu Lu as Secretary Liu
 Gao Zheng as Secretary Li
 Qu Haotian as Secretary Chen
 Feng Qian as Wang Fuqu, Wang Manchun's uncle who raised her. He was responsible for the death of Ming Tai's mother.
 Japanese government
 Matsumine Lilie as Lieutenant Colonel Yōko Minamida (Nihongo: 陸軍中佐南田陽子, Rikugun-Chūsa  Minamida Yōko), a high-ranking official in the Imperial Japanese Army, a high-ranking member of the Japanese government in Shanghai and one of the main antagonists of The Disguiser.
 Hirata Yasuyuki as Yoshimasa Fujita
 Matsuura Noriyuki as Takagi
 Guo Tongtong as Momoko-san

Production
The Disguiser was adapted from Zhang Yong's novel, The Spy War on Shanghai Bund. The script was inspired by the novel's characters who have multiple identities, with many skills to transform and camouflage in a variety of scenarios; and hence the television series' title. The creative team included author Zhang Yong as the screenwriter, Magnolia award-winning director Li Xue, Hou Hongliang as head producer as well as Meng Ke and Wang Shuyi as the main composer of the soundtrack. Other members of the production team include casting and dubbing directors Bi Yingjie, Jiang Guangyao and Zhang Kai, artistic director Shao Changyong, action stunt director Hao Wanjun, costume designer Ru Meiqi and set designer Su Zhiyong.

Location filming began on January 4, and ended on April 27, 2015, where it entered post-production.

Soundtrack 

Tracks 1 through 20 were composed by Meng Ke, while tracks 21 through 24 were composed by Wang Shuyi, who also composed the theme song, "From the Heart (诉衷情)".

Ratings

 Highest ratings are marked in red, lowest ratings are marked in blue

International broadcast

Awards and nominations

References

External links
 The Disguiser on Weibo

Mandarin-language television shows
Hunan Television dramas
2015 Chinese television series debuts
Chinese period television series
Chinese espionage television series
Television shows based on Chinese novels
Television shows set in Shanghai
Television series by Daylight Entertainment
Second Sino-Japanese War television drama series